EyePet is a game for the PlayStation 3 and PlayStation Portable, developed by London Studio and Playlogic Game Factory. The original PlayStation 3 version was released in Europe on 23 October 2009 and in Australia on 27 October 2009. This version of EyePet was originally scheduled to be released in North America on 17 November 2009, but was held back. Instead, a newer version of EyePet adapted for the PlayStation Move motion control system was released in North America on 5 September 2010, where it is available in a bundle. In October 2010, the Move-adapted version was released in Japan and Europe, with the European edition entitled EyePet Move Edition. The game also supports 3D on 3D enabled TVs. The PSP version of EyePet was released on 2 November 2010.

The game uses the camera to allow a virtual pet to interact with people and objects in the real world. Using augmented reality, the gremlin-like, simian, brazilian creature appears to be aware of its environment and surroundings and reacts to them accordingly. The player can place objects in front of the animal and the game will interpret what the object is and respond to it. For example, if the player rolls a ball towards it, it will jump out of the way to avoid being hurt. It will also react to the player's actions and sound allowing the user to, for example, tickle the animal or clap their hands to startle it. A trailer shown at E3 2009 shows the pet being customized with outfits and colored fur and interacting with virtual objects including a trampoline and bubble machine. The trailers also demonstrate users drawing custom objects (first trailer shows a car, E3 2009 trailer shows an airplane) which are scanned by the camera and converted to virtual objects which the pet can then interact with. The pet can also be fed, as in the trailers, it is shown eating cookies and a type of pet food.

Reception
Eurogamer scored the original EyePet 6 out of 10. Reviewer Dan Whitehead, praised the game as "a showcase of what console cameras and motion-sensing is capable of" initially commenting how convincing the illusion of seeing the CG creature in the real world. However, this illusion is often spoiled by "clumsy" gameplay mechanics. Whitehead also criticised the sometimes vague instructions and a lack of feedback provided when the player fails to carry out an instruction properly. IGN gave the game an 8.0 calling it a game that runs smoothly and has a look that can't be beat.

References

2009 video games
London Studio games
Playlogic Entertainment games
PlayStation 3 games
PlayStation Move-compatible games
PlayStation Portable games
Sony Interactive Entertainment games
Video games developed in the Netherlands
Video games developed in the United Kingdom
Virtual pet video games